Leo Determan (born 7 April 1949 in Rotterdam) is a sailor from the Netherlands, who represented his country at the 2008 Vintage Yachting Games in Medemblik The Netherlands. Determan in the middle together with helmsman Rudy den Outer and Ronald den Arend on the foredeck took the Gold medal in the Soling.  
Leo holds several Dutch titles (1995, 1999, 2000, 2008 and 2001) and one Italian title (2010) in the Soling. He used to be member of Yacht Club VZOD, Rotterdam.

Sailing
After sailing as crew on a "Vrijheid class", Determan purchased the Flying Dutchman H 125 "Aquarius" in 1970. With Rudy den Outer he sailed Flying Dutchman, Spanker (a Dutch National class) and Soling for many years and for a brief period Tempest. Depending on the class they changed positions as crew or helmsman.

Professional life 
Determan works in the mineral oil industry. In 2005 Gulf Oil Nederland BV in Den Helder named her new Bunker barge after Determan.

References

1949 births
Living people
Sportspeople from Rotterdam
Dutch male sailors (sport)
Flying Dutchman class sailors
Soling class sailors